Privet is a flowering plant in the genus Ligustrum.

Privet may also refer to:

 HMS Privet, several ships of the British Royal Navy
 SS Privet, a ship in the List of shipwrecks in December 1940
 Privet, along with velcom, trademarks of the Belarus mobile phone operator A1

See also
 Mock privet, (Phillyrea) a genus of two species of flowering plants in the family Oleaceae
 Privet Drive, a fictional road in the Harry Potter universe
 Preved, a meme in the Russian-speaking Internet (a deliberate misspelling of privet)
 Privett (disambiguation)
 Privet, a greeting in Russian